Stigmella barbata is a moth of the family Nepticulidae. It was described by Puplesis and Robinson in 2000 and is known from Las Cuevas, Belize where it is found in Chiquibul Forest Reserve.

References

Nepticulidae
Moths described in 2000
Endemic fauna of Belize
Moths of Central America